The Globe Ranger Station is the principal office of the Globe Ranger District of the Tonto National Forest in Arizona.

The property is listed on the National Register of Historic Places as the Pinal Ranger Station, built in 1934 by the Civilian Conservation Corps. It was listed on the National Register in 1993 for its Spanish style architecture and its role in the U.S. Forest Service's response to the Great Depression. It was designed by architects of the USDA Forest Service.

The Globe Ranger District, which is located north, south, and west of the city of Globe, has an area of approximately 450,000 acres (182,000 ha). Vegetation types include desert, chaparral, and pinyon-juniper.

The Globe Ranger Station is the home base for the Globe Hotshots, an interagency hotshot fire suppression crew.

References

United States Forest Service ranger stations
Civilian Conservation Corps in Arizona
Park buildings and structures on the National Register of Historic Places in Arizona
Spanish Colonial Revival architecture in Arizona
Government buildings completed in 1934
Buildings and structures in Gila County, Arizona
1934 establishments in Arizona
National Register of Historic Places in Gila County, Arizona